Stenoptilia cercelegica is a moth of the family Pterophoridae. It is found in Mongolia (Arhangaj, Cerceleg).

The wingspan is 14–15 mm. The forewings are brown with some sprinkled white scales. Adults are on wing in August.

References

Moths described in 2003
cercelegica
Moths of Asia